Abdoul Karim Danté (born 29 October 1998) is a Malian professional footballer who plays as a centre back for Luxembourgish club Swift Hesperange.

Professional career
On 29 October 2016, Danté signed with Anderlecht and joined their academy after impressing with the Malian club Jeanne d'Arc FC. He made his Belgian First Division A debut for R.S.C. Anderlecht on 6 April 2018 in a 2–1 win against R. Charleroi S.C. coming on as a substitute on the 89th minute.

On 6 August 2019, Danté joined R.E. Virton on a contract until June 2022.

In September 2020, Danté signed with RWDM.

International career
Danté captained the Mali national under-17 football team  at the 2015 African U-17 Championship, and helped lead them to victory as they won the tournament.
Danté also captained the Mali national U-17 football team at the 2015 FIFA U-17 World Cup (October–November 2015, in Chile). He helped Mali achieve the vice-champion result out of 24 national teams.

He made his senior debut with the Mali national football team in a 2-2 2016 African Nations Championship with Uganda on 19 January 2016.
Danté played the Mali-Japan senior match (1-1, in Liège Belgique, on 26 March 2018), wearing the number 2.

Honours
Mali U17:
Winner and captain in African U-17 Championship: 2015
Vice champion and captain: 2015 FIFA U-17 World Cup

References

External links
 CAFOnline Profile
 NFT Profile
 Maxifoot Profile

1998 births
Sportspeople from Bamako
21st-century Malian people
Living people
Malian footballers
Mali under-20 international footballers
Mali youth international footballers
Mali A' international footballers
Mali international footballers
Association football defenders
R.S.C. Anderlecht players
R.E. Virton players
RWDM47 players
FC Swift Hesperange players
Belgian Pro League players
Challenger Pro League players
Luxembourg National Division players
2016 African Nations Championship players
Malian expatriate footballers
Malian expatriate sportspeople in Belgium
Expatriate footballers in Belgium
Malian expatriate sportspeople in Luxembourg
Expatriate footballers in Luxembourg